Pär Bäcker (born 4 January 1982) is a Swedish professional ice hockey player. He is currently playing for the AaB Ishockey in the Oddset Ligaen.

After good seasons with both Grums IK and Bofors IK in Allsvenskan Bäcker was signed by the Swedish Elite club Färjestads BK in 2001. But, by that time,  his talent had also been spotted also another club, the NHL club Detroit Red Wings, who had drafted him one year earlier in the Entry Draft (6th round/187 pick overall). After a mediocre regular season with Färjestad he had great success in the playoffs when he scored 6 points in 10 games and helped Färjestad win their sixth Swedish Championship.
The following season he continued to play as he had done in the playoffs and he finished the year with a total of 27 points in 49 games. After such a successful season, many hockey experts thought that Bäcker would become a big Swedish star in the future. However, that success did not continue in the 2003–04 season, as he registered just 13 points in 49 games in the regular season, and 0 points in 17 games in the playoffs. Things went even worse in both 2004–05 and 2005–06 seasons, as he only scored 11 points in 104 total games over that stretch.  In the playoffs of 2005–06 he wasn't even allowed to practice with the team. He then decided to change clubs, and signed with Färjestad's rival, Djurgårdens IF, in April 2006.

Career statistics

Regular season and playoffs

International

External links

1982 births
Living people
People from Grums Municipality
Swedish ice hockey centres
Swedish expatriate ice hockey players in Denmark
Färjestad BK players
Bofors IK players
Djurgårdens IF Hockey players
Detroit Red Wings draft picks
Sportspeople from Värmland County